Gustavo Andrés Páez Martinez (born April 16, 1990) is a Venezuelan footballer who plays for Mineros de Guayana as a forward.

Career
Born in Mérida, Páez started his senior career playing in lowly club Academia Emeritense. In 2009, he had a short spell with Peruvian Alianza Lima before returning to his home country to play with Zamora FC, in Venezuelan Primera División.

In January 2010 Páez signed with NK Interblock Ljubljana playing in the Slovenian First League; despite being regular at the side, he suffered team relegation at the end of the season. In September 2010 he went to Italy to play for Serie D side A.S. Union Quinto.

In August 2011 Páez moved to Spain, signing with RCD Mallorca and being assigned to the reserves in Segunda División B. After appearing with the Balearics for two seasons, he joined ACD Lara.

On 31 January 2017, it was announced that Paez will sign for South African club Kaizer Chiefs F.C.

National team
Gustavo Páez was part of the Venezuela national U17 team at the 2007 South American Under 17 Football Championship.

References

External sources
 Stats from Slovenia at PrvaLiga.
 

Living people
1990 births
Venezuelan footballers
Venezuelan expatriate footballers
Association football forwards
Club Alianza Lima footballers
Zamora FC players
NK IB 1975 Ljubljana players
RCD Mallorca B players
Asociación Civil Deportivo Lara players
Deportivo La Guaira players
A.C.R. Messina players
Estudiantes de Mérida players
Kaizer Chiefs F.C. players
Atlético Venezuela C.F. players
A.C.C.D. Mineros de Guayana players
Slovenian PrvaLiga players
Segunda División B players
Venezuelan Primera División players
Serie C players
South African Premier Division players
Expatriate footballers in Peru
Expatriate footballers in Slovenia
Expatriate footballers in Italy
Expatriate footballers in Spain
Expatriate soccer players in South Africa
Venezuelan expatriate sportspeople in Peru
Venezuelan expatriate sportspeople in Slovenia
Venezuelan expatriate sportspeople in Italy
Venezuelan expatriate sportspeople in Spain
Venezuelan expatriate sportspeople in South Africa
People from Mérida, Mérida